Transdev Brisbane Ferries, formerly Metrolink Queensland and TransdevTSL Brisbane Ferries, was the operator of the CityCat, CityHopper, and Cross River ferry networks on the Brisbane River in Brisbane, Queensland, Australia from November 2003 until November 2020. The network, operated under contract to the Brisbane City Council, formed part of the TransLink integrated public transport scheme.

History
In August 1991, River Connections took over the operation of Brisbane City Council's fleet of Cityferries. CityCat services began in November 1996 with six vessels, each capable of carrying 149 passengers, with two further vessels added to the fleet in 1998. In December 1998 services east of Norman Park were withdrawn.

In November 2003, Metrolink Queensland (a joint venture between Transdev and Transfield Services) was contracted to operate CityCat and Cityferry services for seven years.

In 2004, when Translink was established, the first second generation CityCat (Beenung-urrung) was introduced and passenger numbers increased by 26%. Late 2004 saw the restructuring of the Cityferry network which included more late night services. In response to the 31% increase in demand for CityCat services in 2005, another second generation CityCat (Tunamun) was introduced.

In January 2007, services were reinstated to Apollo Road.

In 2008, Metrolink Queensland was rebranded as TransdevTSL Brisbane Ferries, to align with the TransdevTSL branding of Transdev and Transfield joint ventures across Australia. Also in 2008, three new CityCats (Meeandah, Wilwinpa and Ya-wa-gara) were launched and the Apollo Road wharf was reopened. In 2009 and 2010, three new CityCats (Mahreel, Kuluwin and Gootcha) were added to the fleet. Early 2010 saw the introduction of three express services during morning peak times. The second and third generation vessels have a capacity of 162 passengers.

In November 2010, a new contract for 10 years commenced. In December 2010 the joint venture was dissolved with Transfield Services selling its shares to Transdev.

All services were suspended on 10 January 2011 due to severe weather prior to the 2011 Brisbane floods. While the CityCat and ferry fleet escaped damage by mooring downstream at the Rivergate Marina or Manly harbour, much of the infrastructure was damaged or destroyed by the floods, causing services to be cancelled indefinitely. Partial CityCat and CityFerry services recommenced on 14 February 2011, using fifteen repaired wharves. Six of the remaining wharves opened using rescued and repaired pontoons on 18 April 2011.

In 2010, Transfield sold its 50% share in TransdevTSL, and all TransdevTSL operations including Brisbane Ferries became 100% Transdev owned. In March 2011, Transdev merged with Veolia Transport (parent of Veolia Transport Queensland) to form Veolia Transdev.

The upgraded West End was opened at the end of July 2011. A new terminal at Northshore Hamilton opened in October 2011.

In order to revitalise patronage on the inner city ferry route, the council converted it into a free service targeted at tourists in 2012. As part of this change, three of the existing fleet of ferries were painted red to be dedicated to the route, named CityHopper.

In July 2013, Veolia Transdev was renamed back to Transdev (with a different logo). As part of the rebranding, TransdevTSL Brisbane Ferries was rebranded as Transdev Brisbane Ferries, and became a subsidiary of Transdev Australasia.

All CityHopper and CityFerry services were suspended 25 July 2020, due to safety concerns over the ageing fleet. From 7 August CityCats started servicing Holman St.

Transdev Brisbane Ferries ceased operating on 3 November 2020, with the next contract awarded to RiverCity Ferries.

Services

CityCat
CityCat services operate from University of Queensland to Northshore Hamilton calling at West End, Guyatt Park, Regatta, Milton, North Quay, South Bank, QUT Gardens Point, Riverside, Sydney Street, Mowbray Park, New Farm Park, Hawthorne, Bulimba, Teneriffe, Bretts Wharf and Apollo Road. Not all CityCat services stop all stops, with some peak time express services operating.

CityHopper
CityHopper is an inner city service between North Quay and Sydney Street, stopping at South Bank, Maritime Museum, Thornton Street, Eagle Street Pier, Holman Street and Dockside. CityHopper services were suspended in July 2020 due to deterioration in the hulls of the ferries.

Cross River
Cross River services operate at three locations.
 Bulimba  Teneriffe
 New Farm Park  Norman Park
 Holman Street  Eagle Street  Thornton Street known as the Kangaroo Point Cross River Service.

Cross River services were suspended in July 2020 due to deterioration in the hulls of the ferries. The Bulimba - Teneriffe service resumed 17 August 2020.

Fleet
As at December 2018, Transdev Brisbane Ferries's fleet consisted of 22 CityCats, 3 CityHoppers and 6 CityFerries. The fleet has grown in size to cater for the significant increase in patronage on CityCat ferry services (by 88% in the last six years). Apart from the support vessels, the fleet is owned by Brisbane City Council and operated by Transdev.

CityCat
The CityCat vessels are catamarans, and named after the Aboriginal place names for various parts of the Brisbane River and adjacent areas (with the exception of the 19th CityCat, the Spirit of Brisbane, which honours the 2011 flood recovery volunteers). All CityCats are operated by a crew of three - a master, a deck hand and a ticket seller.

On 26 November 2019, Transdev Brisbane Ferries commenced operating the new double-decker CityCat, Yoogera, on behalf of Brisbane City Council. Yoogera is the first of the Fourth Generation CityCats, of which Council plans to introduce 7 by 2023. It is the twenty-second CityCat to be built.

First generation
First generation CityCats have a capacity of 149 passengers.

Second generation
Second generation CityCats have a capacity of 162 passengers.

Third generation
Third generation CityCats have a capacity of 162 passengers.

Fourth generation
Two fourth generation CityCats were delivered in 2019/2020. They have a capacity of 170 passengers, including 20 on an open upper deck, plus more space for wheelchairs and bicycles than earlier generations. The vessels which each cost $3.7 million, are being constructed at Murarrie by Aus Ships.

CityHopper
CityHopper is the inner city ferry service.

CityFerry
CityFerry covers shorter distance and cross-river services.

Support vessels
TransDev owns two support vessels.

Ferry network
The wharves are given in geographical order, heading upstream along the Brisbane River.

Wharf damage

In January 2011, all of the wharves were damaged or destroyed during the Brisbane floods and the services were suspended indefinitely. Ten wharves had minor damage (Bretts Wharf, Apollo Road, Teneriffe, Bulimba, Hawthorne, New Farm Park, Mowbray Park, Dockside, Riverside, Guyatt Park), six had moderate damage (Norman Park, Eagle Street Pier, Thornton Street, River Plaza, South Bank 3, South Bank 1 & 2) and seven required rebuilding (Sydney Street, Holman Street, QUT Gardens Point, North Quay, Regatta, West End, University of Queensland). No ferries were lost.

It was expected that the infrastructure repairs would take months to replace. Temporary facilities were operating at most terminals by mid-April 2011.

See also
 Transport in Brisbane

References

External links
Transdev Brisbane Ferries website

Ferry companies of Queensland
Public transport in Brisbane
Translink (Queensland)
Transdev
Transport companies established in 2003
Transport companies disestablished in 2020
2003 establishments in Australia
2020 disestablishments in Australia